Michael John Parenti (born September 30, 1933) is an American political scientist, academic historian and cultural critic who writes on scholarly and popular subjects. He has taught at universities as well as run for political office. Parenti is well known for his Marxist writings and lectures. He is a notable intellectual of the American Left.

Education and personal life
Michael Parenti was raised by an Italian-American working-class family in the East Harlem neighborhood of New York City. After graduating from high school, Parenti worked for several years. Upon returning to school, he received a BA from the City College of New York, an MA from Brown University and a PhD in political science from Yale University. Parenti is the father of Christian Parenti, an academic, author and journalist.

Career 

For many years Parenti taught political and social science at various institutions of higher learning. Eventually he devoted himself full-time to writing, public speaking, and political activism. He is the author of 20 books and over 300 articles. His works have been translated into at least 18 languages.
Parenti lectures frequently throughout the United States and abroad.

Parenti's writings cover a wide range of subjects: U.S. politics, culture, ideology, political economy, imperialism, fascism, communism, democratic socialism, free-market orthodoxies, conservative judicial activism, religion, ancient history, modern history, historiography, repression in academia, news and entertainment media, technology, environmentalism, sexism, racism, Venezuela, the wars in Iraq and Yugoslavia, ethnicity, and his own early life. His book Democracy for the Few, now in its ninth edition, is a critical analysis of U.S. society,
economy, and political institutions and a college-level political science textbook published by Wadsworth Publishing. In recent years he has addressed such subjects as "Empires: Past and Present," "US Interventionism: the Case of Iraq," "Race, Gender, and Class Power," "Ideology and History," "The Overthrow of Communism," and "Terrorism and Globalization."

In 1974, Parenti ran for the U.S. House of Representatives in Vermont as the candidate of the democratic socialist Liberty Union Party; he came in third place, with 7.1% of the vote. Parenti was once a friend of Bernie Sanders, but he later split with Sanders over Sanders's support for the NATO bombing of Yugoslavia.

In the 1980s, he was a visiting fellow at the Institute for Policy Studies in Washington, D.C. In 2003, the Caucus for a New Political Science gave him a Career Achievement Award.
In 2007, he received a Certificate of Special Congressional Recognition from U.S. Representative Barbara Lee.

He served for 12 years as a judge for Project Censored. He also is on the advisory boards of Independent Progressive Politics Network and Education Without Borders as well as the advisory editorial boards of New Political Science and Nature, Society and Thought.

Appearances in media 
Apart from several recordings of some of his public speeches, Parenti has also appeared in the 1992 documentary The Panama Deception, the 2004 Liberty Bound and 2013 Fall and Winter documentaries as an author and social commentator.

Parenti was interviewed in Boris Malagurski's documentary film The Weight of Chains 2 (2014) about the former Yugoslavia. He was also interviewed for two episodes of the Showtime series Penn & Teller: Bullshit!, speaking briefly about the Dalai Lama (Episode 305 – Holier Than Thou) and patriotism (Episode 508 – Mount Rushmore).

New York City-based punk rock band Choking Victim use a number of samples from Michael Parenti's lectures in their album No Gods, No Managers.

Bibliography

Articles
Ethnic Politics and the Persistence of Ethnic Identification  The American Political Science Review, Vol. 61, No. 3, 1967. (pp. 717–726)
Review Symposium: Maximum Feasible Misunderstanding  Urban Affairs Review, Vol. 5, No. 3, 1970. (pp. 329–341)
The Possibilities for Political Change  Politics & Society, Vol. 1, No. 1, 1970. (pp. 79–90)
Power and Pluralism: A View from the Bottom  The Journal of Politics, Vol. 32, No. 3, 1970. (pp. 501–530)
Repression in Academia: A Report from the Field  Politics & Society, Vol. 1, No. 4, 1971. (pp. 527–537)
Book Review: The New Socialist Revolution  Critical Sociology, Vol. 5, No. 1, 1974. (pp. 87–91)
Is Nicaragua More Democratic Than the United States?  CovertAction Information Bulletin, No. 26, 1986. (p. 68)
State Power and the JFK Assassination  Prevailing Winds, No. 1, 1997. (pp. 31–39)
Methods of Media Manipulation  The Humanist, Vol. 57, No. 4, 1997. (pp. 5–7)

Books

 The Anti-Communist Impulse. Random House, 1970.
 Trends and Tragedies in American Foreign Policy. Little, Brown, 1971.
 Democracy for the Few. c.1974.
 8th edition, 2007. 
 Ethnic and Political Attitudes. Arno Press, 1975. 
 Power and the Powerless. St. Martin's Press, 1978. , 
 Inventing Reality: The Politics of the Mass Media. 1986. 
 2nd Edition, 1993. 
 The Sword and the Dollar: Imperialism, Revolution and the Arms Race. St. Martin's Press, 1989. 
 Make-Believe Media: the Politics of Entertainment. St. Martin's Press, 1992. , 
 Land of Idols: Political Mythology in America. St. Martin's Press, 1993. , 
 Against Empire. San Francisco: City Lights Books, 1995. ,  
 Chapter 1 available online.
 Dirty Truths. San Francisco: City Lights Books, 1996. Includes some autobiographical essays. , 
 Blackshirts & Reds: Rational Fascism and the Overthrow of Communism. San Francisco: City Lights Books, 1997. , 
 America Besieged. San Francisco, Calif.: City Lights Books (1998). . .
 History as Mystery. San Francisco, Calif.: City Lights Books (1999). . .
 To Kill a Nation: The Attack on Yugoslavia. Verso, 2002. 
 The Terrorism Trap: September 11 and Beyond. San Francisco, Calif.: City Lights Books (2002). .
 The Assassination of Julius Caesar: A People's History of Ancient Rome. The New Press (2003). .
 Superpatriotism. San Francisco, Calif.: City Lights Books (2004). .
 The Culture Struggle. Seven Stories Press (2006). . .
 Contrary Notions. City Lights Books (2007). . .
 God and His Demons. Prometheus Books (2010).
 The Face of Imperialism. Paradigm (2011).
 Waiting for Yesterday: Pages from a Street Kid's Life Bordighera Press (2013).
 Profit Pathology and Other Indecencies Routledge (2015).

Book chapters
 "American Foreign Policy: A Tragic 'Success'." In: Curtis, Alan (ed). Patriotism, Democracy, and Common Sense: Restoring America's Promise at Home and Abroad. Lanham, Mary.: Rowman & Littlefield; Washington, D.C.: Milton S. Eisenhower Foundation (2004), pp. 159–168.
 "Foreword" In: Alford, Matthew.  Reel Power: Hollywood Cinema and American Supremacy Pluto Press London, pp. vii-xiii.

See also 

 Slavoj Zizek
 Richard D. Wolff
 Noam Chomsky

Notes

References

External links 

 Michael Parenti Political Archive maintained by Michael Parenti as viewed on August 26, 2021 Internet Archive.
 
 
Booknotes interview with Parenti on The Assassination of Julius Caesar, September 7, 2003, C-SPAN

Michael Parenti's articles
 Dubious Design (Creationism & Intelligent Design)

Audio
 Talks by Michael Parenti – MP3 format.
 TUC Radio's Michael Parenti Archive – recordings available for purchase.
Michael Parenti talks about “The Culture Struggle” May 2007 on Democracy Now radio.
October 2006 interview on KPFA radio.

1933 births
20th-century American historians
20th-century American male writers
20th-century American non-fiction writers
21st-century American historians
21st-century American male writers
21st-century American non-fiction writers
American anti-capitalists
American anti-fascists
American anti-poverty advocates
American Book Award winners
American communists
American economics writers
American male non-fiction writers
American Marxist historians
American media critics
American people of Italian descent
American political philosophers
American political scientists
American political writers
Anti-corporate activists
Anti-globalization writers
Brown University alumni
Candidates in the 1974 United States elections
City College of New York alumni
Historians from New York (state)
Historians of the United States
American international relations scholars
Living people
Marxist writers
People from East Harlem
University of Vermont faculty
Writers from Manhattan
Yale University alumni